Honameh (also Romanized as Honāmeh; also known as Honāmeh-ye Bozorg and Honnāmeh-ye Bozorg) is a village in Sivkanlu Rural District, in the Central District of Shirvan County, North Khorasan Province, Iran. At the 2006 census, its population was 318, in 86 families.

References 

Populated places in Shirvan County